The 2015 AFC U-16 Women's Championship was the 6th edition of the AFC U-16 Women's Championship, the biennial international youth football championship organised by the Asian Football Confederation (AFC) for the women's under-16 national teams of Asia. The tournament was held in China between 4–15 November 2015. A total of eight teams played in the tournament.

Same as previous editions, the tournament acted as the AFC qualifiers for the FIFA U-17 Women's World Cup. The top two teams of the tournament qualified for the 2016 FIFA U-17 Women's World Cup in Jordan as the AFC representatives, besides Jordan who qualified automatically as hosts.

North Korea won their second title with a 1–0 final victory over Japan. Both finalists qualified for the World Cup.

Qualification

The draw for the qualifiers was held on 17 June 2014. Four teams qualified directly for the final tournament by their 2013 performance, while the other entrants competed in the qualifying stage for the remaining four spots.

Qualified teams
The following eight teams qualified for the final tournament.

Venues
Wuhan hosted the tournament, with two venues: Xinhua Road Sports Center and Hankou Cultural Sports Centre.

Draw
The draw for the final tournament was held on 13 May 2015 at the AFC House in Kuala Lumpur. The eight teams were drawn into two groups of four teams. The teams were seeded according to their performance in the previous edition in 2013.

Squads

Players born between 1 January 1999 and 31 December 2001 were eligible to compete in the tournament. Each team can register a maximum of 23 players (minimum three of whom must be goalkeepers).

Group stage
The top two teams of each group advanced to the semi-finals.

Tiebreakers
The teams were ranked according to points (3 points for a win, 1 point for a draw, 0 points for a loss). If tied on points, tiebreakers were applied in the following order:
Greater number of points obtained in the group matches between the teams concerned;
Goal difference resulting from the group matches between the teams concerned;
Greater number of goals scored in the group matches between the teams concerned;
Goal difference in all the group matches;
Greater number of goals scored in all the group matches;
Penalty shoot-out if only two teams are involved and they are both on the field of play;
Fewer score calculated according to the number of yellow and red cards received in the group matches (1 point for a single yellow card, 3 points for a red card as a consequence of two yellow cards, 3 points for a direct red card, 4 points for a yellow card followed by a direct red card);
Drawing of lots.

All times were local, CST (UTC+8).

Group A

Group B

Knockout stage
In the knockout stage, penalty shoot-out was used to decide the winner if necessary (extra time was not used).

Bracket

Semi-finals
Winners qualified for 2016 FIFA U-17 Women's World Cup.

Third place match

Final

Winners

Qualified teams for FIFA U-17 Women's World Cup
The following three teams from AFC qualified for the FIFA U-17 Women's World Cup. Jordan qualified as hosts.

1 Bold indicates champion for that year. Italic indicates host for that year.

Awards
The following awards were given at the conclusion of the tournament.

Goalscorers
6 goals
 Wang Yanwen

5 goals
 Hinata Miyazawa

4 goals

 Xie Qiwen
 Kim Pom-ui
 Ri Hae-yon

3 goals

 Jin Kun
 Ma Xiaolan
 Jun Endo
 Hana Takahashi
 Riko Ueki
 Sung Hyang-sim
 Choi Jeong-min

2 goals

 Zhang Linyan
 Saori Takarada
 Mun Eun-ju
 Kanyanat Chetthabutr
 Karen Yaowaporn Lohrmann

1 goal

 Chen Yuanmeng
 Shen Mengyu
 Zhao Yujie
 Rio Kanekatsu
 Seira Kojima
 Fuka Nagano
 Choe Un-chong
 Ri Un-jong
 Gwon Hui-seon
 Jung Min-young
 Yang Hyeon-ji
 Nutwadee Pram-nak
 Shahnoza Kurbonova
 Makhliyo Nazarkulova
 Maftuna Panjieva

References

External links
, the-AFC.com

 
2015
U-16 Women's Championship
2015 in women's association football
2015
2015 in Chinese football
2015 in Japanese women's football
2015 in North Korean football
2015 in South Korean football
2015 in Thai football
2015 in Uzbekistani football
2015 in Taiwanese football
2015–16 in Iranian football
2015 in youth sport
2015 in youth association football
November 2015 sports events in China